Jena is a census town in the Jaridih CD block in the Bermo subdivision of the Bokaro district in the Indian state of Jharkhand.

Geography

Location

Area overview
Bokaro district consists of undulating uplands on the Chota Nagpur Plateau with the Damodar River cutting a valley right across. The East Bokaro Coalfield located in the Bermo-Phusro area and small intrusions of Jharia Coalfield make Bokaro a coal rich district. In 1965, one of the largest steel manufacturing units in the country, Bokaro Steel Plant, operated by Steel Authority of India Limited, was set-up at Bokaro Steel City. The Damodar Valley Corporation established its first thermal power station at Bokaro (Thermal). The soil is generally infertile and agriculture is mostly rain-fed.

Note: The map alongside presents some of the notable locations in the district. All places marked in the map are linked in the larger full screen map.

Demographics
According to the 2011 Census of India, Jena had a total population of 8,143, of which 4,314 (53%) were males and 3,829 (47%) were females. Population in the age range 0-6 years was 7,017. The total number of literate persons in Jena was 5,530 (78.81% of the population over 6 years).

As of 2001 India census, Jena had a population of 7,154. Males constituted 54% of the population and females 46%. Jena had an average literacy rate of 63%, higher than the national average of 59.5%: male literacy was 75%, and female literacy was 50%. In Jena, 14% of the population was under 6 years of age.

Infrastructure
According to the District Census Handbook 2011, Bokaro, Jena  covered an area of 2.69 km2. Among the civic amenities, it had 7 km roads with both open and closed drains, the protected water supply involved uncovered well, handpump. It had 1,392 domestic electric connections, 40 road lighting points. Among the medical facilities, it had 1 hospital, 1 dispensary, 1 health centre, 1 family welfare centre, 1 maternity and child welfare centre, 1 maternity home, 1 nursing home, 3 medicine shops. Among the educational facilities it had 4 primary schools, 1 middle school, 1 secondary school,  the nearest senior secondary school, general degree college at Bandh Dih 2 km away. It had 1 special school for the disabled, 2 working women’s hostels, 1 old age home. Two important commodities it produced were pulses and oil seeds. It had the branch offices of 2 nationalised banks, 1 cooperative bank, 1 agricultural credit society, 1 non-agricultural credit society.

References

Cities and towns in Bokaro district